The 2nd Winter Maccabiah was the second edition of the Winter Maccabiah that took place from February 18 to 22 of 1936 in Banská Bystrica, (then Czechoslovakia). The 2nd Winter Maccabiah was the last Winter Maccabiah to be held and the last Maccabiah to be outside of Israel, although Maccabi still holds smaller regional winter games to present day.

History 
After the 1st Winter Maccabiah which took place in 1933, a second Winter Maccabiah was organized for 1936. Banská Bystrica was chosen to host the Games. Over 2,000 Jewish athletes participated in the games. Following the Germany's annexation of Czechoslovakia in 1939, no further games were ever held. It wasn't until the collapse of Communism in 1989 that new Maccabi clubs were re-established in these areas. In 1996, on the sixtieth anniversary of the 2nd Winter Maccabiah, the Maccabi club of the Jewish community of Banská Bystrica established its own annual commemorative winter games.

Participating communities 
12 nations participated.

References 

Maccabiah Games
Maccabiah Games
Maccabiah Games
Multi-sport events in Czechoslovakia
Sport in Banská Bystrica